KUKU (1330 AM, "Ozark Regional NewsTalk") was an American radio station licensed to serve the community of Willow Springs, Missouri. The station, established in 1957, was owned and operated by Missouri Ozarks Radio Network, Inc. The station's FCC license was cancelled on November 21, 2014 after the station had been silent since March 2013.

It broadcast a news/talk radio format in conjunction with sister station KWPM (1450 AM).

The station was assigned the call sign "KUKU" by the Federal Communications Commission (FCC).

References

External links
Ozark Regional Newstalk Radio

UKU
News and talk radio stations in the United States
Radio stations established in 1957
Howell County, Missouri
1957 establishments in Missouri
Defunct radio stations in the United States
Radio stations disestablished in 2014
2014 disestablishments in Missouri
UKU